Rene Caris (born 18 March 1999) is an Australian rules footballer who played for Geelong Football Club in the AFL Women's (AFLW).

Caris is from Horsham, Victoria and attended Ballarat Grammar School. She played with Greater Western Victoria Rebels in the TAC Cup and Carlton in the VFL Women's (VFLW) competition. She was named in the TAC Cup's "Team of the Year" in 2018, and was subsequently drafted with selection number 35 by Geelong in the 2018 AFL Women's draft. 

Caris made her AFLW debut during the fifth round of the 2019 season, against Brisbane at Moreton Bay Central Sports Complex.

In June 2022, Caris was delisted by Geelong.

Personal life
Caris is currently studying a Bachelor of Civil Engineering at Deakin University.

References

External links 

Geelong Football Club (AFLW) players
1999 births
Living people
Australian rules footballers from Victoria (Australia)
Sportswomen from Victoria (Australia)
Greater Western Victoria Rebels players (NAB League Girls)